The Wright Flyer III was the third powered aircraft by the Wright Brothers, built during the winter of 1904–05. Orville Wright made the first flight with it on June 23, 1905. The Flyer III had an airframe of spruce construction with a wing camber of 1-in-20 as used in 1903, rather than the less effective 1-in-25 used in 1904.  The new machine was equipped with the engine and other hardware from the scrapped Flyer II and, after major modifications, achieved much greater performance than Flyers I and II.

Design and development
The 1905 flyer was made stronger, more durable, and with a longer tail to provide better directional stability and control.  A larger cylinder bore engine provided more power, while a more effective leading edge, and efficient propellers, improved performance.  The propeller blades were made longer and thinner, while according to Harry Combs, "...adding a backward sweep to the blades, calculated precisely to avoid the pressures of flight and to keep the blades free from distortion." Other modifications included vertical rather than horizontal cylinders for its 35-horsepower engine. 

As initially built, the Flyer III looked almost the same as its predecessors, and offered equally marginal performance.  Orville suffered minor injuries in a serious nose-dive crash in the machine on July 14, 1905.  When rebuilding the airplane, the Wrights made important design changes that solved the stability problems of the earlier models.  They almost doubled the size of the elevator and rudder, and moved them about twice the distance from the wings.  They added two fixed half-moon shaped vertical vanes (called "blinkers") between the elevators (but later removed), and widened the skid-undercarriage which helped give the wings a very slight dihedral.  

They disconnected the rear rudder of the rebuilt Flyer III from the wing-warping control, and as in most future aircraft, placed it on a separate control handle.  They also installed a larger fuel tank, and mounted two radiators on front and back struts for extra coolant to the engine for the anticipated lengthy duration flights.  

When testing of Flyer III resumed in September, improvement was obvious.  The pitch instability that had hampered Flyers I and II was brought under control.  Crashes, some of which had been severe, no longer occurred.  Flights with the redesigned aircraft started lasting over 20 minutes.  The Flyer III became practical and dependable, flying reliably for significant durations, and bringing its pilot back to the starting point safely, and landing without damage.

On 19 October 1905, the brothers wrote in a third letter to the U.S. War Department, "We propose to sell the results of experiments finished at our own expense."

Flying at Kill Devil Hills

To keep their knowledge from falling into competitors' hands, the Wrights stopped flying, and disassembled the airplane on November 5, 1905.  

They returned to Kitty Hawk in May of 1908 to flight test their modified 1905 flyer, which they equipped with upright hand controls and seats for the pilot and passenger. They were required by the Signal Corps to produce an airplane "capable of carrying two men and sufficient fuel supplies for a flight of 125 miles, with a speed of at least 40 miles an hour."  They started flying on 6 May, were first witnessed flying by correspondents on 11 May, and flew their first passenger on 14 May.

On May 14, 1908, Wilbur flew mechanic Charles Furnas (1880–1941)  in 29 seconds, making him the first airplane passenger.  The same day, Orville also flew with Furnas, this time  in 4 minutes 2 seconds.  Orville's flight with Furnas was seen by newspaper reporters hiding among the sand dunes; they mistakenly thought Wilbur and Orville were flying together.  He is one of the few people to fly with both Wright brothers (their sister Katharine being another).

Later that day, Wilbur was flying solo when he moved one of the new control levers the wrong way and crashed into the sand, suffering bruises.  The Flyer's front elevator was wrecked, and the practice flights ended.  Due to deadlines for their upcoming public demonstration flights in France and Virginia, the Wrights did not repair the airplane, and it never flew again.

Survivors

The Wright Flyer III was left in its damaged condition in the North Carolina hangar.  In 1911, the Berkshire Museum of Pittsfield, Massachusetts, through one Zenas Crane, obtained most of the components from both the abandoned Flyer and the 1911 Wright glider, but never assembled or exhibited them.  The parts of the 1905 aircraft remained in Massachusetts for almost forty years, until Orville requested their return in 1946 for the Flyer's restoration as a central exhibit at Edward A. Deeds' Carillon Park in Dayton, Ohio.  

Some Kitty Hawk residents also possessed pieces of the 1905 airplane. Deeds and Orville also obtained many of these for the restoration.  At the end of the 1947–1950 restoration process, craftsmen estimated that the 1905 aircraft retained between 60 and 85% of its original material.  The 1905 airplane is now displayed in the Wright Brothers Aviation Center at Carillon Historical Park.  The aircraft and display are part of the Dayton Aviation Heritage National Historical Park.  The restored 1905 Wright Flyer III is the only fixed-wing aircraft to be designated a National Historic Landmark.

Found artifact

A historic missing piece of the Flyer III, thought to be a piece of the original Wright Flyer, turned up in 2010 in the hands of Palmer Wood, whose uncle, Thomas, had given him the piece in the 1960s.  Wood took the piece to Brian Coughlin, an aircraft collector, who, not knowing what the piece was, took it to Peter Jakab of the Smithsonian Institution.

The missing piece is the actuator, which connects the moment chain or arm (the Wrights still used chain link in 1905) to the front elevator.  In the 1940s, Orville gathered all of the stray pieces of the Flyer that were not in Massachusetts from Kitty Hawk locals who, as children, raided the Wrights' 1908 hangar for souvenirs.  The actuator piece, which more than likely broke away in Wilbur's sand dune crash of May 14, 1908, somehow missed Orville's gathering efforts, and was replaced with a solid or flanged piece, which the Wrights did not start using until 1908.

According to Peter Jakab, the flanged piece is not accurate to the 1905 configuration of the Flyer III.  The Wrights in 1905 used a wood assembly joined together by small flat plates and screws.  The solid flat piece now on the Flyer was substituted in the 1947–1950 restoration for the missing actuator.

Specifications (Flyer III)

See also

References
Notes

Bibliography

External links

Dayton Aviation Heritage National Historical Park
Information on mechanic Charles Furnas (updated using Wayback Machine)
Modern flying replica of Wright Flyer III — at Wright.NASA.gov
Rescue and preservation of Wright Flyer III — by Jeanne Palermo, at Wright-Brothers.org
Wright Brothers Flight Logs — at www.CentennialOfFlight.gov

Canard aircraft
National Register of Historic Places in Greene County, Ohio
Historic Mechanical Engineering Landmarks
National Historic Landmarks in Ohio
Prone pilot aircraft
1900s United States experimental aircraft
Flyer III
Single-engined twin-prop pusher aircraft
Aircraft on the National Register of Historic Places
Aircraft first flown in 1905